Melvin Cunningham (born December 16, 1973) is a former American football defensive specialist who played two seasons with the Tampa Bay Storm of the Arena Football League (AFL). He played college football at Marshall University. He was also a member of the Miami Dolphins of the National Football League (NFL).

College career
Cunningham played for the Marshall Thundering Herd from 1993 to 1996. He was an All-American and first team All-Southern Conference selection in 1995 and 1996. He recorded 3 interceptions, returning both for touchdowns, and 27 tackles his senior year in 1996. The Thundering Herd won the Division I-AA national championship in 1996.

Professional career
Cunningham signed with the Miami Dolphins of the NFL on April 27, 1997 after going undrafted in the 1997 NFL Draft. He was released by the Dolphins on August 12, 1997.

Cunningham was signed by the AFL's Tampa Bay Storm during the 1999 off-season. He earned Second Team All-Arena honors in 1999. He missed the 2000 and 2001 seasons due to injury. He was placed on injured reserve on June 18, 2002. Cunningham was later placed on the injured exempt list on January 11, 2003. He was released by the Storm on November 6, 2003.

Coaching career
Cunningham was defensive backs coach of the River Cities LocoMotives of the National Indoor Football League in 2001.

Cunningham became head coach of the Tug Valley High School Panthers of Mingo County, West Virginia in 2000. He was defensive coach for the Burch High School Bulldogs of Delbarton, West Virginia in 2010.
 Cunningham became head coach of the Fairland High School Dragons of Proctorville, Ohio. The team went 0-10 in 2015 and 3-7 in 2016. 2021 season finished 10-2 with a loss in Ohio HS playoffs sweet sixteen round.

References

External links
Just Sports Stats

Living people
1973 births
African-American coaches of American football
African-American players of American football
American football defensive backs
High school football coaches in Ohio
High school football coaches in West Virginia
Marshall Thundering Herd football players
Players of American football from West Virginia
Sportspeople from Huntington, West Virginia
Tampa Bay Storm players
21st-century African-American sportspeople
20th-century African-American sportspeople